The White Dragon is a 2004 Hong Kong wuxia comedy film directed by Wilson Yip and starring Cecilia Cheung and Francis Ng.

The White Dragon is directed by Wilson Yip, whose best known works to date are Bullets Over Summer, Juliet in Love and SPL: Sha Po Lang. It stars Cecilia Cheung as Phoenix Black, a pretty, young, and vain student who thinks she has what it takes to woo the most desirable eligible bachelor in the land, Second Prince Tian Yang (Andy On).

Plot
In a twist departing from the standard superhero formula, White Dragon is a narcissist, forever worried about her good looks, even as she's fighting with Feather, a blind assassin nicknamed "Chicken Feathers" because of his propensity for using chicken feathers as his calling card.

Chicken Feathers is first challenged by White Dragon, an elderly woman with proficient skills in martial arts to almost match his, but not quite enough. Thinking that she has been fatally wounded, White Dragon transfers her kung-fu knowledge into empty shell Black Phoenix, turning the young woman into the prettiest martial arts expert around. The downside to having these extraordinary powers, which she does not fully understand, is bad acne, which she manages to prevent only by doing "noble" deeds like robbing from the rich and giving to the poor.

Phoenix is reluctant to take on her new role at first, but soon becomes interested in tracking down Chicken Feathers when she learns that her love interest, Second Prince Tian Yang, might become his next target. Using her flute-playing as bait, White Dragon finally faces Chicken Feathers in an attempt to defeat him before he can carry out the assassination. Chicken Feathers proves to be too good for the new White Dragon, however. When White Dragon tries to exploit his "weak points," she ends up injured(breaking her leg while trying to kick Feathers in the nuts) and dependent on Feathers, who does nurse her back to health after their heated battle.  While Chicken Feathers plays nurse, White Dragon seeks to find his true weak point to stop him once and for all. What she finds instead is that Chicken Feathers has fallen in love with her, and that he is growing on her as well.

After a while her leg healed and Chicken Feathers found a letter for Second Prince Tian Yang and had it read by the town's doctor. This letter made Chicken Feathers thinking that Black Phoenix already has a boyfriend, namely the Second Prince Tian Yang. Chicken Feathers confronted Phoenix Black with this and they ended up struggling. Accidentally the girl stabbed her flute into the back of Chicken Feathers, which gave him a moment of sight. She ran away.

The Third Prince, brother of the Second Prince, apparently hired Chicken Feathers to kill his brother, this was revealed at the very last scene.

Cast
Cecilia Cheung as Black Phoenix / White Dragon Jr.
Francis Ng as Chicken Feathers
Xu Chen Junlei as young Chicken Feathers
Andy On as Second Prince Tian Yang
Patrick Tang as Gene
Kitty Yuen as Tweetie
Benz Hui as Deer Tail
Suet Nei as Auntie / White Dragon Sr.
Liu Lei as First Prince Tian Sheng
Huang Xiaoyu as Linda
Dang Chi-fung as Principal Wong
Shi Zhangjin as Eagle
Xia Taili as Emperor
Meng Kai as Third Prince Tian Feng
Zhang Jiajun as court official
Liu Jingcheng as Uncle Black
Wen Wen as Mandy
Hu Danfeng as Daisy
Bi Yuanbiao as Eunuch Chan
Shen Zunying as Linda's schoolmate
Hu Xiaolin as Linda's schoolmate
Wang Yiqiu as Linda's schoolmate
Huang Di as Linda's schoolmate
Ding Xiaolong as imperial guard
Zhu Mingming as imperial guard
Li Suqin as imperial guard
Zhang Dengke as imperial guard
Dai Tian as imperial guard

External links

2004 films
Hong Kong martial arts films
Wuxia films
China Star Entertainment Group films
Films directed by Wilson Yip
2000s Hong Kong films